The Beretta AL391 is a semi-automatic shotgun.  It is manufactured, marketed, and distributed by Fabbrica d'Armi Pietro Beretta, in Gardone Val Trompia, Italy.

The AL391 is most often used for hunting birds, and for clay target games such as trap and skeet.  There are several different models, each with multiple variations. Has been often referred to as the best semi auto ever made. The AL391 is chambered in either 12 gauge or 20 gauge.

Features
The Beretta AL391 is mechanically similar to its predecessor, the AL390, but has a slimmer fore-end and a different shaped stock.  It has an aluminum receiver, which reduces the weight of the gun.  The magazine holds three rounds, providing a total capacity of four rounds, which can be reduced using a magazine plug.  The gun has a magazine cut-off, which can be engaged to remove or replace a chambered shell without feeding a new round from the magazine.

The AL391 has a self-compensating gas-driven recoil system.  This lacks the mechanical simplicity of some other recoil systems.  However, it provides the advantage of automatically adjusting for shot shells with different charges and therefore different amounts of recoil.  It is designed to cycle the action reliably when using a wide variety of shells, while minimizing felt recoil.

Models
 AL391 Urika: The standard model, available with a variety of features and finishes.
 AL391 Teknys: A more upscale version of the Urika, with upgraded finishing and fancier engraving.
 A391 Xtrema: Designed for hunting waterfowl, the Xtrema accepts shells up to 3½-inch magnums and has been produced in 12 gauge only.

See also
 Beretta Xtrema 2

References

 Simpson, Layne. "The AL 391: Beretta's Best", Shooting Times
 Coogan, Joe. "Beretta’s A391 Xtrema 3.5 Gobbles Up The Turkeys", Shooting Times
 Wakeman, Randy. "Beretta AL391 Urika 2 Shotguns", ChuckHawks.com
 "20-Gauge Semis: Beretta Ekes Out Win in Competition Clash", Gun Tests, June 2008
 "Beretta’s New AL391 Urika: A New Standard For Shotguns?", Gun Tests, July 2000

External links
 Beretta semi-automatic field guns
 Beretta AL391 Urika / Teknys Instruction Manual
 Beretta AL391 Urika 2 ratings, prices and reviews

AL391
Semi-automatic shotguns of Italy